Fred. L. Bonfoey (April 28, 1870 - January 23, 1933) was an American architect. He was a prolific designer of bungalows in Charlotte, North Carolina. Bonfoey came to Charlotte from Connecticut in 1918. His bungalow style homes are in the Elizabeth, Dilworth, and Plaza-Midwood sections of Charlotte. Bonfoey lived at 1509 North Davidson Street.

Work
Armature Winding Company Complex
Fred L. Bonfoey home at 800 Worthington Avenue

References

Further reading
Fred L. Bonfoey

1870 births
1933 deaths
Artists from Charlotte, North Carolina
Architects from North Carolina
Architects from Connecticut